The 2003 Notre Dame Fighting Irish football team represented the University of Notre Dame in the 2003 NCAA Division I-A football season. The team was coached by Tyrone Willingham and played its home games at Notre Dame Stadium in South Bend, Indiana. The Irish finished the season at 5–7 and failed to become bowl eligible. The season was punctuated by a pair of three-game losing streaks and ugly blowout losses against Michigan, USC and Florida State.

Season overview
The 2003 season began with the Irish losing a number of key players to graduation, including Arnaz Battle and center Jeff Faine. They were boosted, however, by the return of running back, Julius Jones, who was reinstated to the team after a year of academic ineligibility. In Willingham's first full year of recruiting, he signed a top-5 class. Of the 20 recruits signed, 12 were four-star recruits (high school recruits are rated on a star scale, with one star indicating a low-quality recruit and five stars indicating the highest-quality recruit). These new recruits included future stars Victor Abiamiri, Chinedum Ndukwe, Brady Quinn, Jeff Samardzija, and Tom Zbikowski

The Irish began their season ranked 19th and facing the hardest schedule in the nation. They opened against the Washington State Cougars, playing the team for the first time in the history of the program. The Irish came back from being down by 19 points to win in overtime, but Carlyle Holiday struggled as quarterback. In the next game against rival Michigan, the Wolverines avenged their 2002 loss by beating the Irish by a score of 38–0 in the first shutout in the series in 100 years and the largest margin of victory ever between the two teams. After another loss to Michigan State, many Irish fans were calling for Holiday to be taken out of the game in favor of freshman Brady Quinn, who saw his first collegiate action in the fourth quarter of the Michigan rout. Holiday was replaced as starter for the next game against Purdue.

In Quinn's first start, the Irish were bolstered with Quinn's 297 passing yards on 59 attempts. However, Purdue's defense intercepted four of Quinn's passes and sacked him five times en route to a 23–10 Boilermaker victory. Quinn remained as the starter and, with Willingham's acknowledgment that the running game needed to take more of a role in the next game, got his first win against Pittsburgh. He was helped by Julius Jones' school-record 262 rushing yards. Notre Dame lost their next three games, including Willingham's second straight 31 point loss to USC, a last minute loss to Boston College, and their first home shutout since 1978 to Florida State. The Irish players began to call the season disappointing, as the team needed to win their last four games to make a bowl game. They looked to have a chance of becoming bowl eligible, as their next three games were a last minute win that improved their streak to 40 games over Navy, a win on senior day over the Brigham Young University (BYU) Cougars, and a win over Stanford that saw the Irish offense finally connect in the season. Notre Dame lost their final game to Syracuse, however. With a 5–7 record, the Irish finished with the twelfth losing season in the history of the Notre Dame football program.

Schedule

Game summaries

Washington State

Roster

References

Notre Dame
Notre Dame Fighting Irish football seasons
Notre Dame Fighting Irish football